Leucoptera pulchricola is a moth in the family Lyonetiidae. It is known from South Africa.

The larvae feed on Ochna pulchra.

References

Endemic moths of South Africa
Leucoptera (moth)
Moths of Africa
Moths described in 1955